MDPHP (3',4'-Methylenedioxy-α-pyrrolidinohexiophenone) is a stimulant of the cathinone class originally developed in the 1960s, which has been reported as a novel designer drug. In the UK its slang name is monkey dust. It is closely related to the potent stimulant MDPV though with slightly milder effects, and has been used as an alternative in some countries following the banning of MDPV.

Legal Status
MDPHP is specifically listed as a controlled substance in Japan  and Hungary, and is controlled under analogue provisions in a number of other jurisdictions.

See also 
 α-Pyrrolidinohexiophenone (α-PHP)
 3',4'-Methylenedioxy-α-pyrrolidinopropiophenone (MDPPP)
 N-Ethylhexedrone
 N-Ethylhexylone

References 

Designer drugs
Pyrrolidinophenones
Benzodioxoles
Butyl compounds